Jacupiranga is a municipality in the state of São Paulo in Brazil. The population is 17,889 (2020 est.) in an area of 704 km². The elevation is 33 m.

The municipality contains part of the  Rio Turvo State Park, created in 2008.

See also
 Jacupiranga State Park

References

External links
Jacupiranga at citybrazil.com
Official webseite of the municipality

Municipalities in São Paulo (state)